Fisher's Ghost is a 1924 Australian silent film directed by Raymond Longford based on the legend of Fisher's Ghost. It is considered a lost film.

Synopsis
The film is set in 1820s New South Wales. Two transported convicts, George Worrall and Frederick Fisher, are released and take up farms at Campbelltown. They are both successful and become friends. Worrall persuades Fisher to go on a trip to England and says he will manage Fisher's farm. A few months later, Worrall goes to an estate agent with a letter from Fisher saying that he has decided to stay in England and has instructed Worrall to sell his farm.

In 1826, a settler called Farley sees an apparition who purports to be Fisher sitting on a three rail fence. This apparition claims he was murdered by Worrall and later indicates where Fisher's body lays. Worrall is arrested at his wedding to a girl who does not return his affections. He is tried, convicted and sentenced to death. He eventually confesses to the crime.

Cast
Robert Purdie as George Worrall
Fred Twitcham as Frederick Fisher
Lorraine Esmond as Nell Thompson
Percy Walshe
William Ryan
Ted Ayr as Jim Mead, the love interest
William Coulter
Charles Keegan
Ruby Dellew
Ada St. Claire
Charlotte Beaumont
Ike Beck

Production
Raymond Longford and Lottie Lyell, in association with Charles Perry, formed a new company together: Longford-Lyell Productions. Fisher's Ghost marks the production company's first film.

According to on contemporary account the film was shot on location in Campbelltown under the title The Life and Death of Frederick Fisher. Longford sought the advice of Campbelltown residents and also explored the records on the subject from the local Mitchell Library. Another report however says the film was shot on location entirely in Windsor, featuring such locations as the Fitzroy Hotel and the old courthouse.

The film was completed by August 1924.

Fisher's Ghost, The Bushwhackers (1925), and Peter Vernon's Silence (1925) were the only three films produced by Longford-Lyell Productions as the company had already entered liquidation in June 1924, even before the film's release.

Although Lottie Lyell and Raymond Longford created many films together, Fisher's Ghost and The Bushwhackers are the only films for which Lyell received credit as scriptwriter and assistant director before her death from tuberculosis in 1925.

Reception
Reviews were strong as was public response.

The film is attributed to being one of the earliest and influential Australian horror films, paving the way for the resurgence of the genre in the 1970s after the Australian government began funding their movie industry.

Union Theaters rejected the film be released in their Sydney theaters because their managing director, Stuart F. Doyle, claimed the film was "too gruesome" for the public. The film was shown in Hoyt theaters and yielded £1,300 in its first week of screenings.

The head of the actor's federation claimed the film was prejudiced against by sales agents.

In 1934 Longford registered a script for a remake of the film. However it was never made.

In 2010, Tony Buckley, a producer who helped find and restore the 1971 Australian film Wake in Fright, called for a Film Search program to locate the lost negatives of Fisher's Ghost as well as other historic Australian films.

References

External links

Fishers Ghost script at National Archives of Australia
Fisher's Ghost at National Film and Sound Archive
Fisher's Ghost at AustLit
Fisher's Ghost:: Old Crime Recalled, a detailed summary of the film's plot

1924 films
1924 drama films
Australian drama films
Australian silent feature films
Australian black-and-white films
Films directed by Raymond Longford
Lost Australian films
1924 lost films
Lost drama films
Silent drama films